HMS Princess Charlotte was a 104-gun first-rate ship of the line of the Royal Navy, built by Nicholas Diddams (but completed after his death) launched on 14 September 1825 at Portsmouth. The occasion was notable for the fact that the gates of the dry dock into which she was to be placed burst because of the high tide and more than 40 people were drowned.

When first ordered in 1812 she was intended to be a second rate of 98 guns, but in the general reclassifications of 1817 she was reclassed as a first rate.

From 1837 to 1841 she served as the flagship of the Mediterranean Fleet flying the flag of Vice Admiral Sir Robert Stopford and thus took part in the Syrian War and the bombardment of Acre. She had a crew of 738 men.

Her commanders included Captain Robert Devereux Fanshaw from 1837 to 1841 (as flagship to Admiral Sir Robert Stopford) and Sir Henry George Thomsett from 1858 to 1861.

She became a receiving ship at Hong Kong in 1858, and was sold in 1875.

Notes

References

 Lavery, Brian (2003) The Ship of the Line - Volume 1: The development of the battlefleet 1650-1850. Conway Maritime Press. .

External links
 

Ships of the line of the Royal Navy
Princess Charlotte-class ships of the line
Victorian-era ships of the line of the United Kingdom
Ships built in Portsmouth
1825 ships